Dr. Jean Chapman House is a historic home located at Cape Girardeau, Missouri.  It built in 1963, and is a one-story, "V"-shaped dwelling with Wrightian style influences. It is built on a steeply sloped lot and is constructed almost entirely of local Ste. Genevieve limestone.

It was listed on the National Register of Historic Places in 2015.

References

Houses on the National Register of Historic Places in Missouri
Modernist architecture in Missouri
Houses completed in 1963
Houses in Cape Girardeau County, Missouri
National Register of Historic Places in Cape Girardeau County, Missouri